The 1953 Railway Cup Hurling Championship was the 27th series of the inter-provincial hurling Railway Cup. Three matches were played between 8 February 1953 and 17 March 1953 to decide the title. It was contested by Connacht, Leinster, Munster and Ulster.

Munster entered the championship as the defending champions.

On 17 March 1953, Munster won the Railway Cup after a 5-07 to 5-05 defeat of Leinster in the final at Croke Park, Dublin. It was their 21st Railway Cup title overall and their sixth title in succession.

Munster's Christy Ring was the Railway Cup top scorer with 3-05.

Results

Semi-finals

Final

Railway Cup statistics

Top scorers

Overall

Single game

Miscellaneous

 In the semi-final between Munster and Ulster, the referee, Dick O'Shea, blew the full-time whistle with 8 minutes of the second half remaining. Munster were leading by 22 points at that stage.

Sources

 Donegan, Des, The Complete Handbook of Gaelic Games (DBA Publications Limited, 2005).

References

Railway Cup Hurling Championship
Railway Cup Hurling Championship